The Malay College Kuala Kangsar (abbreviated MCKK;) is a premier residential school in Malaysia. It is an elite all-boys and all-Malay school in the royal town of Kuala Kangsar, Perak. It is sometimes dubbed "the Eton College of the East".

The Malay College Kuala Kangsar was awarded the Cluster School of Excellence title by the Ministry of Education (Malaysia). Since 2010, the school was awarded with the Sekolah Berprestasi Tinggi or High Performance School title, a title awarded to Malaysian top schools that have met stringent criteria including academic achievement, strength of alumni, international recognition, network and linkages. The school has been selected as International Baccalaurate (IB) World School for Diploma Programme since 2011 and Middle Years Programme since 2016. The Malay College Kuala Kansas offers the national curriculum (SPM) while implementing IB curriculum standards. MCKK is also a member of an international organisation of best secondary schools in the world called Global Alliance of Leading-Edge Schools led by Raffles Institution of Singapore. About 10% of current students are with public & private scholarships, such as Bank Negara Malaysia, Telekom Malaysia, Yayasan Peneraju Pendidikan Bumiputera and many more.

The school is one of the only two boarding schools in Malaysia (the other is Sekolah Alam Shah, under the patronage of Sultan of Selangor) that are under royal patronage. The school's patron is the Conference of Rulers. As an institution under the royal patronage of Conference of Rulers, the school receives royal visits from Yang di-Pertuan Agong, King of Malaysia every five years and every year from Sultan of Perak as school's board chairman. The board members are also appointed by the Conference.

The school specialises in rugby, basketball, hockey, debate, robotics and most prominently, leadership. It currently leads Malaysian schools in education and innovation.

History
The Malay College Kuala Kangsar (MCKK) is the first fully residential school in Malaysia. Established on 2 January 1905, it was originally known as the Malay Residential School of Kuala Kangsar, also then formerly known as Maktab Melayu Kuala Kangsar in Malay.

The school was the brainchild of R J Wilkinson, inspector of schools for the Federated Malay States. In a letter to the resident-general dated 24 February 1904 he wrote about "establishing at a suitable locality in the F.M.S., a special residential school for the education of Malays of good family and for the training of Malay boys for admission to certain branches of Government service".

Its formation was supported by the rulers of the Federated Malay States: Sultan Idris Murshidul ‘Adzam Shah I of Perak, Sultan Alaiddin Sulaiman Shah of Selangor, Yam Tuan Tuanku Muhammad Shah of Negeri Sembilan and Sultan Ahmad Mu’adzam Shah of Pahang.

William Hargreaves, headmaster of Penang Free School, was appointed as the first headmaster to lead the establishment of the school with 40 pioneering students. Since 1965, the Malay College has been led by Malay headmasters.

As it was founded to educate the Malay elite, being royal children and the sons of Malay nobility, few of its early students were from commoner families. However, during Tun Abdul Razak Hussein's tenure as Minister of Education in 1947, as a result of rising Malay nationalism, he democratised the intake. This is mainly because of his experience as an alumnus there, where he found out the aristocrats that gained admittance to this college were mainly below par compared to their less-privileged peers in Victoria Institution and Raffles Institution. Their status as aristocrats had caused them to not be independent and to have no willingness to strive for a better future. Today, only selected Malay boys aged 13 to 17 from around Malaysia are educated there.

Some of the well known teachers include Pendeta Za'Ba and Anthony Burgess.

The Straits Echo on 15 April 1905 reported that a few boys were placed in cozy dormitories in Hargreaves’ rented house, while the others were stabled in small houses formerly occupied by the Malayan Railway clerks. The second half of the school, conducted by Mr. Vanrenen was held in a fowl house. There were 40 boys in the first intake.

The sanction for the building of a permanent school became official on 23 December 1905; by 1 May 1909, the Big School was first brought into use. On Saturday, 11 December 1909, the Big School was officially opened by the Sultan of Perak, and the auspicious date also marked the change in the name of the school from the Malay Residential School of Kuala Kangsar to the Malay College of Kuala Kangsar.

The change seems to have seen greater emphasis on the original aim of MCKK. A report from 1910 said: "From this school the Government have great hopes that the sons of Malays of the Raja and higher class will be educated and trained on the lines of an English Public School and be fitted to take a share in the Government of their Country."

Since its inception, more than 5,000 boys (and 2 girls) have entered the gates of MCKK. The first The Malay College Magazine was published in 1939. The compulsory white uniforms were introduced in 1949, before that, the students wore Malay dress. The MCKK samping designed and woven in Terengganu consisting of black, yellow and red (with resultant overlapping colours) was introduced in 1939 to be worn with white Baju Melayu and black songkok was made the optional Malay uniform. It was only made compulsory in 1959 by the last British Headmaster, NJ Ryan.

The Headmaster changed the names of the 3 Houses (Rookies, Heads and Wheelies) to the four names of FMS Rulers in 1905. He was the same Headmaster who personally raised the UMNO flag on Federation Day, 01/02/1948, when the MCKK boys assembled to celebrate the demise of the Malayan Union and to sing the "new Malay National Anthem" as described by Hashim Sam Latiff. MCKK adopt (& perhaps adapt) that tune to be the MCKK Anthem using the words in the "Ode to the MCKK" penned by teacher-cum-poet/writer/composer Anthony Burgess. His words, turned into lyrics for the anthem, manifests the meaning of Fiat Sapientia Virtus.

In October 1989, the Queen, Elizabeth II and Prince Philip, Duke of Edinburgh visited the school.

In 2004, the college was made under purview of the rulers with then Crown Prince of Perak, Raja Dr Nazrin Shah was appointed as board chairman.

The college celebrated its centenary on 26 March 2005, attended by dignitaries, old boys, and townspeople. The Yang di-Pertuan Agong of Malaysia attended the event, along with the royal rulers of the states of Perak, Selangor and Negeri Sembilan as well as the governor of Malacca. The college were also proclaimed as the Heritage Institution of Culture and Country.

On 10 June 2006, Emperor Akihito and Empress Michiko of Japan visited the school. The monarchs had promised to visit the school in the 1990s.

Since 30 May 2007, the Malaysian Ministry of Education has recognised MCKK as a cluster school.

In 2010, the school have been selected to be among the first High Performance Schools while in 2013, the Prep School celebrated its centenary.

MCKK has also hosted two international events, which are The Malay College Youth Development Summit since 2008 until now, and The Malay College Rugby Premier Sevens since 2011. Both events consist of international schools across the globe such as Southeast Asian countries like Singapore, Indonesia and Thailand together with premier schools from India, South Korea, South Africa and Australia.

Buildings

The most recognisable feature of the school is the Big School (built in 1909), a building with pseudo Greco-Roman architecture fronted by a rugby field. The school is built to accommodate 100 students initially, but in 1910, there were 139 boys in the School Register, 124 of them boarders. Thus, the planning for the construction of the Preparatory School was considered and it was referred to as the Sekolah Kechil. The block was completed by 1913 when it took in its first boarders. It was then referred to as the Prep School. It admitted boys who had completed Standard 4 and were being "prepared" for secondary school boarding experience by completing their Standard 5 and Form Remove at the Prep School. In 1955, the West and East Wing, as well as the administration block and Clock Tower were added. The administrative block (New School) was opened by High Commissioner for the Federation of Malaya, Donald MacGillivray, in 1955. The West and the East Wing, with the original Big School, make up what is now called the Big School. Dorms 1-6 are located in the East Wing, 7-16 in the Overfloor and 17-22 in the West Wing. Two more hostel blocks, the Pavilion and New Hostel were built in 1963 and 1972 respectively; the latter houses second former. Another prominent feature of the school is the Big Tree, a rain tree (Samanea saman) in front of the East Wing that is said to be as old as the original Big School itself.

Presently, the Prep School houses the Form 1 students, the Pavillion houses the Form 2 students while the Big School houses students from Form 3 to Form 5

Houses
From a time gap between 1947 till 2018, Mohd Shah has the most wins for Best House with a winning rate of 34%, followed with Sulaiman 24%, Ahmad with 24% and Idris with 18%. The table shows the current apartment for 2019.

Tuesday Activities
Unlike other schools in Malaysia, co-curricular activities at the College are usually conducted every Tuesday. There are two types of co-curricular activities which are Club & Societies and Uniformed Bodies. The students wear their uniformed body attire on this day. The uniformed bodies that are present in the school are The Malay College Marching Band, Army Cadet Corps, Red Crescent Society, Scout Troops, Fire Brigade Cadet and Malaysia Youth Cadet Corps. Club & Societies at the college come and go depending on the interests of the teachers and boys at the college at the time, but some have been around for a long period. Some of the Clubs & Societies that are currently in existence include: Debate, History, French Language, English Language, Malay Language, Innovation, Robotics, and more.

Sports
The school has four sports areas. The main field is in front of the Big School, equipped with two fields reserved for rugby, soccer ("the Big Field"). The Big Field also doubles as a cricket pitch with the crease running along the football pitch alongside. To the east of Big School, sits three basketball courts, two immediately north of the East Wing and the Tun Haniff Court alongside the pathway between East Wing and the New Hostel. The hockey turf is located in front of New Hostel. The main volleyball court is located in front of the East Wing and three other volleyball courts located next to West Wing, Pavilion and New Hostel. A squash court sits immediately north of Dorm 3 and 4. There is also a gymnasium within the New School block, sitting next to the Prep School basketball court, and the Prep School football pitch and another one behind the West Wing. A short course swimming pool on the west of the Big School accommodates the water polo team and hosts the annual Swimming Gala. Next to it is Arena 72, a futsal court with 2 other futsal courts behind the hokey turf. In front of the main gate is a slanting perch of grass slightly smaller than a full football pitch and house Padang C where collegians play football during games hours. Prep School and New Hostel has its own playing field at its compound, equipped with rugby uprights and football goal posts.

The college ground is the only place in Malaysia where an Eton Fives court is found. The court is located on the south side of the Big School, nearby the IB World School campus. With the introduction of squash in 1938, Eton Fives began to lose popularity at the school until it was not played at all. Since a trip in August 2014 by two top English players the game's popularity has grown and more students are now playing again. Today, the students compete annually in The Schools National Championships, United Kingdom at Highgate School, Eton College and Shrewsbury School.
 
The school excels in sports and debate. It became a powerhouse in Rugby Union during the 1960s and is currently the best rugby school team in the nation. Nicknamed "MCKK All Blacks" after the New Zealand national team for its all black strip, they perform the haka before matches. Traditionally, it has held a match series against the Vajiravudh College of Thailand since 1960. In odd-numbered years, the match is held in Kuala Kangsar. In even-numbered years, it is held in Bangkok. In addition to this, MCKK competes with its prominent rivals every year in a multi-games carnival.

The school basketball team is called "MCKK Cagers" and won Piala Hamdan Tahir, the boarding-schools basketball championship, 19 times since 1977, the most in Malaysian history. MCKK debate teams have won Piala Perdana Menteri, the boarding-schools national debate, five times for Malay category and twice for English category.

Rivalries
MCKK has over the years established academic and sports rivalries with several premier schools, for example, Royal Military College, Victoria Institution, both in the capital Kuala Lumpur, King Edward VII School of Taiping, Sekolah Alam Shah in Putrajaya, and its neighbour, Clifford Secondary School. Notably, the most prominent rival is Sekolah Tuanku Abdul Rahman in Ipoh, which is one of the oldest Malay boarding school in Perak along with the MCKK.

Coat of arms
The shield is divided per cross, from dexter: white (argent) in the first quarter, red (gules) in the second, black (sable) in the third and yellow (or) in the fourth. Blazon: Per cross Argent, Gules, Sable and Or, overall charged with Malay dagger Gules with hilt Or. In crest: A Malayan tiger caboshed Or. Motto: Or, Fiat Sapientia Virtus in Sable.

The colours represent the four houses into which the students are grouped: Idris (white), Sulaiman (red), Mohd Shah (yellow) and Ahmad (black).

In the middle of the shield is a red kris, a traditional Malay dagger. On top of the crest is a head of a tiger which is the symbol of the Federation of Malaya. Surrounding the left and right side of the shield are laurel wreaths symbolising excellence. The school motto is Fiat Sapientia Virtus, which is Latin for "Manliness Through Wisdom".

Notable alumni

The alumni association of MCKK is known as the Malay College Old Boys' Association (MCOBA) and it was established in 1929. In 2009, the association enrolled its first non-Malay member, Liew Yong Choon.

To this date, seven Yang di-Pertuan Agong out of thirteen that have resided the throne were its alumni (including a Lord President of the Supreme Court) and a Sultan of Brunei. Out of the four states that have Yang di-Pertua Negeri, two states have had at least one alumnus reside in office. The father of Malay nationalism and the founder of Malaysia's largest party is also an alumnus. A Prime Minister and a Deputy Prime Minister (who later on became Leader of the Opposition) received their education in the college. The college also has produced two Speakers of the Dewan Rakyat. The college's Old Boys also gain their presence in economy, education, law, armed forces and art.

The novelist and composer Anthony Burgess (1917–93), author of The Long Day Wanes: A Malayan Trilogy, was a master at MCKK. He taught English and history and was housemaster at King's Pavilion, between 1956 and 1957, during the headmastership of J.D.R. "Jimmy" Howell. According to Burgess' This Man & Music, he wrote some music there under the influence of the country, notably Sinfoni Melayu for orchestra and brass band, which included cries of Merdeka (independence) from the audience. No score of any, however, has been delivered to posterity. The "Ode: Celebration for a Malay College", Burgess had written for the college's 50th anniversary in 1955, "was swiftly expunged from the school's choral repertoire", when "within months ... he had to leave the school after falling out with the headmaster, JD Howell. The following year Burgess published his first novel, Time for a Tiger. A thinly veiled account of his time at Kuala Kangsar, it so cruelly caricatured Howell and his colleagues that, as Burgess recalled in his autobiography, some of those who deemed themselves traduced 'sought advice about libel' from a local lawyer. The verses of the Ode have survived but not Burgess' original melody.

The alumni association is based in a dilapidated building called "Penthouse" of the MCOBA building on Jalan Syed Putra, Kuala Lumpur.

Headmasters

See also
 Education in Malaysia
List of Malay College Kuala Kangsar alumni

References
Notes

Bibliography
 Johan, Khasnor. Educating The Malay Elite: The Malay College Kuala Kangsar, 1905-1941. Pustaka Antara. Malay College Old Boys Association. The Malaysian Branch of the Royal Asiatic Society. 
 Johan, Khasnor. Leadership But What's Next? 
 Paridah Abd. Samad (2009). Datuk Seri Najib: A Long Political Journey. From The Golden Boy of Malaysian Politics to Malaysia's Sixth Prime Minister. Partisan Publication & Distribution.

Further reading
 Neil J Ryan. The Last Expatriate: Reminiscences of an educationalist in Malaysia. Utusan Publications & Distributors Sdn. Bhd. 
 Nik Ismail Nik Daud. Arbain Kadri. Prosiding Simposium MCOBA 1. 3 December 1989.

External links

 Official website

Colleges in Malaysia
Educational institutions established in 1905
Kuala Kangsar District
1905 establishments in British Malaya
International Baccalaureate schools in Malaysia
Boys' schools in Malaysia